B. Nagendra is an Indian politician from the state of Karnataka and three times elected member of the Karnataka Legislative Assembly.
Elected to Karnataka Legislative Assembly from Bellary constituency in May 2018 election.

Education 

He is a B.com. graduate from Veerashaiva College, Bellary, Gulbarga University in the year 1993.

Career
He represents  Bellary Rural constituency from Ballari district as a member of Karnataka Legislative Assembly as an INC candidate. He was elected as Member of Legislative Assembly from Kudligi from 2008-2018 as BJP and Independent candidate respectively. He was a former close aide of Mining Baron Gali Janardhan Reddy.

External links
 Karnataka Legislative Assembly

1971 births
Living people
Indian National Congress politicians from Karnataka
Karnataka MLAs 2008–2013
Karnataka MLAs 2013–2018
Karnataka MLAs 2018–2023